The Northern Ireland Executive is the devolved government of Northern Ireland, an administrative branch of the legislature – the Northern Ireland Assembly. It is answerable to the assembly and was initially established according to the terms of the Northern Ireland Act 1998, which followed the Good Friday Agreement (or Belfast Agreement). The executive is referred to in the legislation as the Executive Committee of the assembly and is an example of consociationalist ("power-sharing") government.

The Northern Ireland Executive consists of the First Minister and deputy First Minister and various ministers with individual portfolios and remits. The main assembly parties appoint most ministers in the executive, except for the Minister of Justice who is elected by a cross-community vote. It is one of three devolved governments in the United Kingdom, the others being the Scottish and Welsh governments.

In January 2017, the then deputy First Minister Martin McGuinness resigned in protest over the Renewable Heat Incentive scandal and the Northern Ireland Executive consequently collapsed. The governing of Northern Ireland fell to civil servants in a caretaker capacity until January 2020, when the parties signed the New Decade, New Approach agreement and an Executive was subsequently established.

Legal basis
The Executive (and the Assembly) were established in law by the Northern Ireland Act 1998 that followed the Good Friday Agreement and its basis was revised by the Northern Ireland (St Andrews Agreement) Act 2006 that followed the St Andrews Agreement of that year.

Ministers
On 9 May 2016, the number of ministries and departments of the Northern Ireland Executive was reduced, leaving the following departments:

 The Executive Office
 Minister of Agriculture, Environment and Rural Affairs
 Minister for Communities
 Minister of Education
 Minister for the Economy
 Minister of Finance
 Minister of Health
 Minister for Infrastructure
 Minister of Justice

At the same time, various departments were renamed as follows: 
 The Office of the First Minister and deputy First Minister was renamed the Executive Office
 The Department of Agriculture and Rural Development was renamed the Department of Agriculture, Environment and Rural Affairs
 The Department of Enterprise, Trade and Investment was renamed the Department for the Economy
 The Department of Finance and Personnel was renamed the Department of Finance
 The Department of Health, Social Services and Public Safety was renamed the Department of Health
 The Department for Regional Development was renamed the Department for Infrastructure
 The Department for Social Development was renamed the Department for Communities

The following departments were dissolved:
 The Department of Culture, Arts and Leisure
 The Department of the Environment 
 The Department for Employment and Learning

Structure

In contrast with Westminster system cabinets, which generally need only be backed by a majority of legislators, ministerial positions in the Northern Ireland Executive are allocated to parties with significant representation in the Assembly.  With the exception of justice, the number of ministries to which each party is entitled is determined by the D'Hondt system.

In effect, major parties cannot be excluded from participation in government and power-sharing is enforced by the system. The form of government is therefore known as mandatory coalition as opposed to voluntary coalition where parties negotiate an agreement to share power. The Democratic Unionist Party (DUP), the Ulster Unionist Party (UUP), the Alliance Party of Northern Ireland and some Social Democratic and Labour Party (SDLP) members favour a move towards voluntary coalition in the longer term but this is currently opposed by Sinn Féin.

The executive cannot function if either of the two largest parties refuse to take part, as these parties are allocated the First Minister and deputy First Minister positions.  However, other parties are not required to enter the executive even if they are entitled to do so; instead, they can choose to go into opposition if they wish. There were some calls for the SDLP and the UUP to enter opposition after the 2007 Assembly elections, but ultimately the two parties chose to take the seats in the Executive to which they were entitled.

In 2010, an exception to the D'Hondt system for allocating the number of ministerial portfolios was made under the Hillsborough Castle Agreement to allow the cross-community Alliance Party of Northern Ireland to hold the politically contentious policing and justice brief when most of those powers were devolved to the Assembly.  Devolution took place on 12 April 2010.

Under D'Hondt, the SDLP would have been entitled to the extra ministerial seat on the revised Executive created by the devolution of policing and justice. Accordingly, both the UUP and SDLP protested that Alliance was not entitled, under the rules of the Good Friday Agreement, to fill the portfolio and refused to support this move. However, Alliance leader David Ford was elected Minister with the support of the DUP and Sinn Féin.

On 26 August 2015, the UUP announced it would withdraw from the Executive and form an opposition after all, in response to the assassination of Kevin McGuigan.

On 25 May 2016 a new executive was announced (three weeks after assembly election). For the first time in the assembly's history, parties that were entitled to ministries (i.e. UUP, SDLP and Alliance) chose instead to go into opposition following a recent bill providing parties with this choice. This meant that the executive was formed only by the two major parties, the DUP and Sinn Féin, and thus giving them more seats in the Executive (with the exception of the Department of Justice which was given to an Independent Unionist MLA, Claire Sugden, due to this appointment needing cross-community support).

Procedure

The Executive is co-chaired by the First Minister and deputy First Minister. Its official functions are:
acting as a forum for the discussion of, and agreement on, issues which cut across the responsibilities of two or more ministers;
prioritising executive and legislative proposals;
discussing and agreeing upon significant or controversial matters; and
recommending a common position where necessary (e.g. in dealing with external relationships).

Executive meetings are normally held fortnightly, compared to weekly meetings of the British Cabinet and Irish Government. Under the Executive's Ministerial Code, ministers are obliged to:
operate within the framework of the Programme for Government;
support all decisions of the Executive and Northern Ireland Assembly; and
participate fully in the Executive, the North/South Ministerial Council and the British-Irish Council.
The Ministerial Code allows any three ministers to request a cross-community vote. The quorum for voting is seven ministers.

The current system of devolution has succeeded long periods of direct rule (1974–1999 and 2002–2007), when the Northern Ireland Civil Service had a considerable influence on government policy. The legislation which established new departments in 1999 affirmed that "the functions of a department shall at all times be exercised subject to the direction and control of the Minister". Ministerial powers can be conferred by an Act of the Assembly and ministers can also exercise executive powers which are vested in the Crown.

Ministers are also subject to several limitations, including the European Convention on Human Rights, European Union law, other international obligations of the UK, a requirement not to discriminate on religious or political grounds, and having no power over reserved and excepted matters (which are held by the United Kingdom Government).

Ministerial decisions can be challenged by a petition of 30 Northern Ireland Assembly members.  This action can be taken for alleged breaches of the Ministerial Code and on "matters of public importance". The Speaker of the Assembly must consult political party leaders in the Assembly (who are often also ministers) before deciding whether the subject is a matter of public importance. Successful petitions will then be considered by the Executive.

The number of ministers and their responsibilities can be changed when a department is being established or dissolved. The proposal must be made by the First Minister and the deputy First Minister and be carried by a cross-community vote in the Assembly. The number of departments was initially limited to 10 but this increased to 11 upon the devolution of justice.

Ministers are disqualified from holding office if appointed to the Government of Ireland or as the chairman or deputy chairman of an Oireachtas (Irish Parliament) committee.

Strategies
The Good Friday Agreement states that the Executive will "seek to agree each year, and review as necessary" a Programme for Government incorporating an agreed budget.

The following programmes for government have been published to date:
Draft Programme for Government (2001–2002) (25 October 2000)
Draft Programme for Government (2002–2003) (24 September 2001)
Programme for Government 2008–2011 (22 January 2008)
Programme for Government 2011–2015 (12 March 2012)

The following budgets have been published to date:

Budget 2008–11
Budget 2011–15

Under the St Andrews Agreement, the Executive is obliged to adopt strategies on the following policy matters:
enhancing and protecting the development of the Irish language;
enhancing and developing Ulster Scots language, heritage and culture; and
tackling poverty, social exclusion and patterns of deprivation based on objective need.

The Office of the First Minister and Deputy First Minister published a child poverty strategy in March 2011. The wider anti-poverty strategy was carried over from direct rule in November 2006. As of November 2011, neither an Irish language strategy nor an Ulster Scots strategy had been adopted. The Department of Culture, Arts and Leisure states that a Strategy for Indigenous or Regional Minority Languages "will be presented to the Executive in due course".

History

1974
The original Northern Ireland Executive was established on 1 January 1974, following the Sunningdale Agreement. It comprised a voluntary coalition between the Ulster Unionist Party, Social Democratic and Labour Party and Alliance Party of Northern Ireland, with the UUP's Brian Faulkner in the position of Chief Executive. It was short-lived, collapsing on 28 May 1974 due to the Ulster Workers' Council strike, and the Troubles continued in the absence of a political settlement.

Composition since devolution

1998–2002

The current Executive was provided for in the Belfast Agreement, signed on 10 April 1998. Designates for First Minister and deputy First Minister were appointed on 1 July 1998 by the UUP and SDLP, respectively. A full Executive was nominated on 29 November 1999 and took office on 2 December 1999, comprising the UUP, SDLP, Democratic Unionist Party and Sinn Féin.
Devolution was suspended for four periods, during which the departments came under the responsibility of direct rule ministers from the Northern Ireland Office:
 between 12 February 2000 and 30 May 2000;
 on 11 August 2001;
 on 22 September 2001;
 between 15 October 2002 and 8 May 2007.

The 2002–2007 suspension followed the refusal of the Ulster Unionist Party to share power with Sinn Féin after a high-profile Police Service of Northern Ireland investigation into an alleged Provisional Irish Republican Army spy ring.

2007–2011
The second Executive formed in 2007 was led by the DUP and Sinn Féin, with the UUP and SDLP also securing ministerial roles. 

However, the Executive did not meet between 19 June 2008 and 20 November 2008 due to a boycott by Sinn Féin. This took place during a dispute between the DUP and Sinn Féin over the devolution of policing and justice powers. Policing and justice powers were devolved on 12 April 2010, with the new Minister of Justice won by Alliance in a cross-community vote.

2011–2016
Following the Northern Ireland Assembly election held on 5 May 2011, a third Executive was formed on 16 May 2011 with the same five parties represented.  Alliance for the first time gained administration of a department under the D'Hondt system, in addition to the Department of Justice.

Peter Robinson of the DUP and Martin McGuinness of Sinn Féin were nominated by their parties and appointed as First Minister and deputy First Minister on 12 May 2011. Traditional Unionist Voice leader Jim Allister opposed the joint appointment. On 16 May 2011, 10 other Executive ministers (with the exception of the Minister of Justice) and two junior ministers were appointed by their political parties. The Minister of Justice was then elected by the Assembly via a cross-community vote.

On 26 August 2015, the UUP withdrew from the Executive in protest over the alleged involvement of members of the Provisional IRA in the murder of Kevin McGuigan Sr. Danny Kennedy MLA's position as Minister for Regional Development was later taken over by the DUP, thereby leaving four Northern Irish parties in the power sharing agreement. On 10 September 2015 Peter Robinson stepped down as First Minister, although he did not officially resign. Arlene Foster took over as acting First Minister. Robinson subsequently resumed his duties as First Minister again on 20 October 2015.

Following the signing of the Fresh Start Agreement, Peter Robinson announced his intention to stand down as leader of the DUP and First Minister of Northern Ireland. He subsequently resigned as DUP leader on 18 December 2015, being succeeded by Arlene Foster. Foster then took office as First Minister on 11 January 2016.

2016–2017
The fourth Executive was formed following the May 2016 election. The SDLP, UUP and Alliance Party left the Executive and formed the Official Opposition for the first time. Ministerial positions were proportionally allocated between the DUP and Sinn Féin, with independent unionist Claire Sugden serving as Minister of Justice. The government collapsed on 16 January 2017, after Martin McGuinness resigned in protest over the Renewable Heat Incentive scandal. His resignation sparked a snap election as Sinn Féin refused to re-nominate a deputy First Minister.

In 2018, Arlene Foster stated that the ongoing political deadlock was caused by Sinn Féin's insistence on an Irish Language Act that would grant legal status to the Irish language in Northern Ireland, which Foster's party refuses to allow.

Northern Ireland (Executive Formation) Act 2019 

The Northern Ireland (Executive Formation and Exercise of Functions) Act 2019 was passed by the UK parliament on 10 July 2019 and became law on 24 July. The main purpose of the bill was to prevent another election and keep Northern Ireland services running in the absence of a functional devolved government. However, two Labour MPs, Conor McGinn and Stella Creasy, added amendments that would legalize same-sex marriage and liberalize abortion law (both devolved issues) if the DUP and Sinn Féin could not come to an agreement before 21 October.

Reformation
On 11 January 2020, the Executive was re-formed with Arlene Foster as First Minister and Sinn Féin's Michelle O'Neill as deputy First Minister following the New Decade, New Approach agreement. All five parties joined the government; other ministers include Edwin Poots (DUP); Robin Swann (UUP), Nichola Mallon (SDLP), Gordon Lyons (DUP), and Declan Kearney (SF). Alliance Party leader Naomi Long was appointed justice minister. At the first session of the assembly, Foster stated that it was "time for Stormont to move forward". The new speaker of the assembly is a member of Sinn Féin. The collapse of this executive led to the 2022 Northern Ireland Assembly election.

Executive committee

No executive has been formed since the 2022 Northern Ireland Assembly election. Before that, members of the last executive were elected on 11 January 2020. 
  

Ministers are assisted by backbench "Assembly private secretaries" (equivalent to parliamentary private secretaries). The non-political Attorney General for Northern Ireland is the chief legal advisor to the Executive, appointed by the First Minister and deputy First Minister, and may also attend Executive meetings.

See also

 Devolution in the United Kingdom
 Government spending in the United Kingdom
 Northern Ireland peace process

References

External links
 Northern Ireland Executive
 nidirect/tedireach portal

 
1999 establishments in Northern Ireland
Government agencies established in 1999
Political office-holders in Northern Ireland
1999 establishments in the United Kingdom